Maureen McLane (born December 24, 1967) is an American poet, critic, and professor. She received the National Book Critics Circle Award.

Life 

McLane was raised in upstate New York. She holds degrees from Harvard University, University of Oxford (where she was a Rhodes Scholar), and University of Chicago. 
She is the author of four books of poetry, including This Blue. My Poets (FSG, 2012), a hybrid of memoir and criticism, was a finalist for the 2012 National Book Critics Circle Award for autobiography. McLane is also a contributing editor at Boston Review and poetry editor at Grey. She is currently professor of English at New York University.

Reception and influence 

McLane's first full-length poetry collection (Same Life: poems, Farrar, Straus & Giroux, 2008) was a finalist for the Lambda Literary Award and The Publishing Triangle Audre Lorde Award. It was named as one of the Chicago Tribune Literary Editor's Best Books. Her follow-up book, World Enough: poems (Farrar, Straus & Giroux, 2010), was selected by Paul Muldoon in The New Yorker as a best poetry book of the year.
McLane achieved literary celebrity with the publication of her hybrid criticism-biography My Poets, which Paris Review editor Lorin Stein called "the survey course of my dreams." My Poets was lauded in The New York Times, NPR, Bookforum, New York Observer, Boston Globe, and elsewhere for its groundbreaking hybridity.

Writing in Bookforum, Parul Sehgal remarked that "To read McLane is to be reminded that the brain may be an organ, but the mind is a muscle. Hers is a roving, amphibious intelligence; she's at home in the essay and the fragment, the polemic and the elegy."

Awards 

 National Book Critics Circle 2012 Finalist in Autobiography
 Golden Dozen Award, New York University College of Arts and Sciences Teaching Award, 2012 
 New York University Humanities Institute, Faculty Award for Publishing the Most Books in 2008 
 Harvard University Certificate of Distinction in Teaching, Committee on Undergraduate Education, 2006 
 John Clive Teaching Award in History and Literature, Harvard University, 2005 
 National Book Critics Circle Nona Balakian Award for Excellence in Book Reviewing, 2003

Bibliography

Poetry

Collections

McLane, Maureen N. (2017). Some Say: poems. Farrar, Straus, & Giroux.
McLane, Maureen N. (2019). What I'm Looking For: selected poems 2005-2017. Penguin.
McLane: Maureen N. (2021). More Anon: Selected Poems. Farrar, Straus, & Giroux.

List of poems

Non-fiction

References 

1967 births
Living people
American critics
Harvard University alumni
New York University faculty
The New Yorker people
American Rhodes Scholars
University of Chicago alumni
Alumni of the University of Oxford
21st-century American poets